Hendrik "Henk" Pieter Starreveld (28 April 1914 – 8 August 2008) was a Dutch canoeist who competed in the 1936 Summer Olympics.

He was born in Amsterdam.

In 1936 he and his partner Gerardus Siderius finished fifth in the K-2 10000 metres competition.

References

1914 births
2008 deaths
Canoeists at the 1936 Summer Olympics
Dutch male canoeists
Olympic canoeists of the Netherlands
Sportspeople from Amsterdam
20th-century Dutch people